Storozhev (masculine) or Storozheva (feminine) is a Russian surname shared by the following people:

Nikita Storozhev, joint winner in the male vocal category of the 1978 International Tchaikovsky Competition
Tatyana Storozheva (born 1954), Soviet hurdler
Vera Storozheva (born 1958), Russian actress and film director

See also
Sabbas of Storozhev, Orthodox monk and saint

Russian-language surnames